"Read My Mind" is the first single by Sweetbox from the album Jade, with Jade Villalon as a frontwoman. "Read My Mind" samples Cavalleria Rusticana from Pietro Mascagni.

An acoustic version and the music video of the song can be found on the album Jade (Silver Edition). A live version of the song can be found on the album Live.

The song was composed by Geoman and Villalon, and the music video for the song was directed by Marc Schoelermann.

Track listing

Credits
The 'EP Edition' was remixed by Satoshi Hidaka.

The song was covered by Taiwan band S.H.E. releasing it as Always on My Mind.

References

Sweetbox songs
2002 singles
Songs written by Jade Villalon
2002 songs
Warner Music Group singles